Robert Neumann (born 8 October 1972) is a Czech former football player. He played in the top flight of his country, making more than 240 appearances spanning the existence of the Czechoslovak First League and the Gambrinus liga.

Honours

Club
 Slovan Liberec
Czech Cup: 1999–2000
Gambrinus liga: 2001–02

References

1972 births
Living people
Czech footballers
Czechoslovak footballers
Czech First League players
Bohemians 1905 players
FK Jablonec players
FC Slovan Liberec players

Association football midfielders